The  is a giant paper fan, usually made in a closed fashion. It is most traditionally used as part of a  act, in which the straight man smacks the funny man in response to their jokes or idiocy.

In popular culture

Kaname Chidori of the anime Full Metal Panic uses a  that she seems to pull out from hammerspace to stop Sousuke Sagara from doing anything that could injure or kill a civilian in Tokyo; at one point, her  is seen to be extendable and takes up as much space as a matchbox.
In the manga Negima!, character Asuna Kagurazaka wields a giant sword-sized  that later transforms into an enormous single-edged sword.
The character Dr. Eto in the series Nodame Cantabile is known by the nickname "Harisen" because he uses one to punish his students.
In the video game Persona 5, the characters can use an ability called "Harisen Recovery", in which they use a giant  to heal status effects inflicted on fellow party members. 
In the video game series Super Smash Bros. up until Super Smash Bros. Brawl, a large fan (called "" in the Japanese version, but simply "Fan" in Western versions) is a usable item. Characters can wield it as a very fast weapon, causing minimal but repeated and nigh-unstoppable damage to enemy characters. The item's trophy in Brawl mentions its origin as a  prop. Additionally, in Super Smash Bros. Ultimate, one of Banjo & Kazooie's attacks from Banjo-Tooie (in which Banjo uses Kazooie as a bludgeon) reappears, and is referred to as "Harisen Kazooie" in Japanese as according to the director, Masahiro Sakurai. This ability was originally called "Breegull Bash" in English.

See also

 Slapstick, a wooden device traditionally used in the West for a similar purpose.

References

External links 

Ventilation fans
Japanese tools
Japanese culture
Practical joke devices
Culture articles needing translation from Japanese Wikipedia
Japanese words and phrases